Blackwell was a rural district in Derbyshire, England from 1894 to 1974.  It was created under the Local Government Act 1894 based on that part of the Mansfield rural sanitary district which was in Derbyshire (the Nottinghamshire part forming Skegby Rural District).  

It was abolished under the Local Government Act 1972, becoming part of the new district of Bolsover.

The parishes within the district included: 
Ault Hucknall
Blackwell
Glapwell
Pinxton
Pleasley
Scarcliffe
Shirebrook
South Normanton
Tibshelf

References
https://web.archive.org/web/20071001031648/http://www.visionofbritain.org.uk/relationships.jsp?u_id=10042987

History of Derbyshire
Districts of England created by the Local Government Act 1894
Districts of England abolished by the Local Government Act 1972
Rural districts of England
Bolsover District